Alexandre Germain was the stage name of the French actor Germain Alexandre Poinet (17 June 1847 – 31 November 1938). He created leading comic roles in several of Georges Feydeau's most successful farces.

Life and career
Germain was born in Paris. He made his student debut at the Théâtre-École de la Tour d'Auvergne in 1863 and his professional debut the following year in Zut au berger! at the Théâtre des Folies-Marigny. He was based there until 1869, when he joined the company of the Théâtre Château-d'Eau (1869–1872) and then the Théâtre des Variétés (1872–1890). He took leave of absence from time to time to appear in plays at the Châtelet, Bouffes-Parisiens and the Folies-Dramatiques. He toured in the US and Russia with Anna Judic.

The Bibliothèque nationale de France lists the following as Germain's productions from the later part of his career. Among them are five full-length plays by Georges Feydeau (Champignol malgré lui (title role), L'Hôtel du libre échange (Pinglet), La Dame de chez Maxim) (Petypon), La Puce à l'oreille (Victor-Emmanuel and Poche), and Occupe-toi d'Amélie! (Pochet).

1881 – Les mille et une nuits
1883 – Fanfreluche
1883 – Les pommes d'or
1888 – La fille de Madame Angot
1890 – Samsonnet
1891 – La demoiselle du téléphone
1892 – Champignol malgré lui
1892 – La bonne de chez Duval
1893 – Mon Prince
1894 – L'Hôtel du libre échange
1898 – Le contrôleur des wagons-lits
1899 – La dame de chez Maxim
1900 – Les maris de Léontine
1901 – Le coup de fouet
1902 – La duchesse des Folies-Bergère
1904 – La dame du 23
1904 – La gueule du loup
1905 – Le gigolo
1905 – Champignol malgré lui
1905 – Florette et Patapon

1905 – Dix minutes d'arrêt
1906 – La petite Madame Dubois
1906 – La dame de chez Maxim (revival)
1906 – Le pavé de l'ours
1907 – La cabotine
1907 – La puce à l'oreille
1907 – Vingt jours à l'ombre
1908 – Dix minutes d'auto
1908 – Occupe-toi d'Amélie
1908 – Coralie et Cie
1909 – Article 301
1909 – Théodore et Cie
1909 – Moins cinq
1909 – Une grosse affaire
1910 – On purge bébé
1910 – L'enlèvement des sabines
1910 – Noblesse oblige
1911 – Et ma soeur?
1912 – La présidente
1913 – Les deux canards

Germain died in Paris on 31 November 1938, at the age of 91.

Notes

1847 births
1938 deaths
19th-century French male actors
19th-century theatre
20th-century French male actors
20th-century theatre
French male stage actors
Male actors from Paris